Arthur Meaby (5 October 1935 – 19 September 2003) was a British engineer and a volunteer for the Youth Hostels Association.

Early life
Meaby was born in 1935 in the Chelsea area of London. Both of his parents died during his childhood, and his teenage years were spent living with his stepmother in Brighton. After completing his education, he became an engineering apprentice. He worked at the Southern Region Lancing Railway Carriage and Wagon Works.

Youth Hostels Association
Meaby's connection with the Youth Hostels Association (YHA) began when he was in Brighton, when a Northern Irish youth hosteller was lodging with them. Meaby travelled with him to a youth hostel in County Antrim, and soon became a member of the local YHA group in Brighton.

Meaby co-founded the cities division of the YHA in England and Wales, with future Association chairman Derek Hanson. The focus of the cities division was to establish hostels in major tourist cities such as London and Oxford, which would help to finance the many rural hostels across the country.

During the 1980s, Meaby served as the chairman of the London region of the Association. He oversaw the development of several hostels in the city, including those in Rotherhithe, London Docklands and one near Hampstead Heath. When the new Eurostar terminal at St Pancras railway station was announced in 1998, Meaby established a hostel on Euston road, opposite the station.

As well as his work improving urban hostels, Meaby oversaw refurbishment work at hostels in the Hebrides, namely those in Rhenigidale, Berneray and South Uist.

References

1935 births
2003 deaths
English railway mechanical engineers
People from Chelsea, London
Engineers from London